Hamid Seyyed Mahdavi-Aghdam (born 1952) is an Iranian politician.

Seyyed Mahdavi-Aghdam was born in Tabriz. He is a member of the 6th Islamic Consultative Assembly from the electorate of Tabriz, Osku and Azarshahr with Akbar A'lami, Esmaeil Jabbarzadeh, Ali-Ashraf Abdollah Porihoseini, Mir-Taher Mousavi and Ali-Asghar Sherdost.

References

Politicians from Tabriz
Deputies of Tabriz, Osku and Azarshahr
Living people
1952 births
Members of the 6th Islamic Consultative Assembly
21st-century Iranian politicians